The indigenous languages of Malaysia belong to the Mon-Khmer and Malayo-Polynesian families. The national, or official, language is Malay which is the mother tongue of the majority Malay ethnic group. The main ethnic groups within Malaysia are the Malay people, Han Chinese people and Tamil people, with many other ethnic groups represented in smaller numbers, each with its own languages. The largest native languages spoken in East Malaysia are the Iban, Dusunic, and Kadazan languages. English is widely understood and spoken within the urban areas of the country; the English language is a compulsory subject in primary and secondary education. It is also the main medium of instruction within most private colleges and private universities. English may take precedence over Malay in certain official contexts as provided for by the National Language Act, especially in the states of Sabah and Sarawak, where it may be the official working language. Furthermore, the law of Malaysia is commonly taught and read in English, as the unwritten laws of Malaysia continues to be partially derived from pre-1957 English common law, which is a legacy of past British colonisation of the constituents forming Malaysia. In addition, authoritative versions of constitutional law and statutory law  (written laws of Malaysia) are continuously available in both Malay and English.

Malaysia contains speakers of 137 living languages, 41 of which are found in Peninsular Malaysia. The government provides schooling at the primary level in each of the three major languages, Malay, Mandarin and Tamil. Within Malay and Tamil there are a number of dialectal differences. There are a number of Chinese languages native to the ethnic Han Chinese who originated from Southern China, which include Yue, Min and Hakka Chinese.

Malay

The official language of Malaysia is the Malay language. There are 10 dialects of Malay used throughout Malaysia. Malay became predominant after the 13 May Incident. A variant of the Malay language that is spoken in Brunei is also commonly spoken in East Malaysia. Standard Malay is often a second language following use of a local Malay dialect. The standard language is promoted as a unifying symbol for the nation across all ethnicities, linked to the concept of Bangsa Malaysia (Malaysian nation). The status as a national language is codified in Article 152 of the constitution. The passage of the National Language Act 1963/67 also strengthened the position of the language.
The Education Act of 1996 reiterates that Malay is to be "the main medium of instruction in all educational institutions in the National Education System", with certain exceptions.

Other indigenous languages
Citizens of Minangkabau, Bugis or Javanese origins, who can be classified as "Malay" under constitutional definitions, may speak their respective ancestral tongues alongside Malay. The native tribes of East Malaysia have their own languages, which are related to but easily distinguishable from Malay. Iban is the main tribal language in Sarawak, while the Dusun and Kadazan languages are spoken by the natives in Sabah. Some of these languages remain strong, being used in education and daily life. Sabah has ten other sub-ethnic languages: Bajau, Bruneian, Murut, Lundayeh/Lun Bawang, Rungus, Bisaya, Iranun, Sama, Suluk and Sungai. There are over 30 native ethnic groups, each of which has its own dialect. These languages are in danger of dying out unlike the major ones such as Kadazan-Dusun, which have developed educational syllabuses. Iban also has developed an educational syllabus. Languages on the peninsula can be divided into three major groups: Negrito, Senoi, and Malayic, further divided into 18 subgroups. The Semai language is used in education. Thai is also spoken in northern parts of the peninsula, especially in northern Langkawi and mainland Kedah, Perlis, northern Perak, northern Terengganu, and northern Kelantan.

English

Malaysian English, also known as Malaysian Standard English (MySE), is a form of English derived from British English, although there is little official use of the term except with relation to education. English was used in the Parliament briefly upon independence (then as Federation of Malaya), prior to a gradual and complete transition to the Malay language, and continued to be used today for specific terminologies with permission. English, however, remains an official language in the State Legislative Assemblies and Courts of Sabah and Sarawak. Malaysian English differs little from standard British English.

Malaysian English also sees wide usage in business, along with Manglish, which is a colloquial form of English with heavy Malay, Chinese, and Tamil influences. Many Malaysians (particularly those who live in urban areas) are conversant in English, although some are only fluent in the Manglish form. The Malaysian government officially discourages the use of Manglish. Many businesses in Malaysia conduct their transactions in English, and it is sometimes used in official correspondence.

The federal constitution provides that English would continue to serve as an official language for at least 10 years after Merdeka until the parliament provides otherwise. The passage of the National Language Act re-iterated the primacy of Malay as an official language for most official purposes, however the act provides for the use of English in certain official contexts. Among these, section 5 provides that English may be used in the parliament and state assemblies with the presiding officer's permission. Article 152(3) of the constitution and sections 6–7 of the National Language Act provide that all federal and state laws must be enacted in Malay and English.

The Malaysia Agreement, provided for the continued use of English in Sabah and Sarawak for any official purpose. Under article 161(3) of the constitution, federal legislation affecting the use of English in Sabah and Sarawak would not become law in these states unless approved by their respective legislative assemblies. Sarawak has not adopted the National Language Act; meanwhile Sabah has amended its constitution to provide for Malay as "the official language of the state cabinet and assembly".

English was the predominant language in government until 1969. There is significant tension regarding the status and usage of English in the country, as the language is seen both as a historical colonial imposition and as a crucial skill for academic achievement and global business. English served as the medium of instruction for Maths and Sciences in all public schools per the PPSMI policy, but reverted to Bahasa Malaysia in national schools and mother-tongue languages in 2012. The Parent Action Group for Education and former Prime Minister Mahathir Mohamad has called for science and maths to be taught in English again.

The English language is an important aspect of the legal system in the country. The law of Malaysia is commonly taught and read in English, as the unwritten laws of Malaysia continues to be partially derived from pre-1957 English common law, which is a legacy of past British colonisation of the constituents forming Malaysia. In addition, authoritative versions of constitutional law and statutory law (written laws of Malaysia) are continuously available in both Malay and English.

Chinese language and regiolects
As a whole, Standard Chinese (Mandarin) and its Malaysian dialect are the most widely spoken forms among Malaysian Chinese, as it is a lingua franca for Chinese who speak mutually unintelligible varieties; Mandarin is also the language of instruction in Chinese schools and an important language in business.

As most Malaysian Chinese have ancestry from the southern provinces of China, various southern Chinese varieties are spoken in Malaysia (in addition to Standard Chinese (Mandarin) which originated from northern China and was introduced through the educational system. The more common forms in Peninsular Malaysia are Hokkien, Cantonese, Hakka, Hainanese, Teochew, and Hokchew.  Hokkien is mostly spoken in Penang, Kedah, Perlis, Klang, Johor, Northern Perak,  Kelantan, Terengganu, and Malacca, whereas Cantonese is mostly spoken in Ipoh, Kuala Lumpur, Seremban  and Kuantan. In Sarawak, most ethnic Chinese speak Hokkien, Hokchew, or Hakka. Hakka predominates in Sabah except in the city of Sandakan where Cantonese is more frequently spoken despite the Hakka origins of the Chinese residing there.

As with Malaysian youths of other ethnicities, most Chinese youth are multilingual and can speak at least three languages with at least moderate fluency – Mandarin, English, and Malay, as well as their Chinese regiolect and/or the dominant Chinese regiolect in their area. However, most Chinese regiolects are losing ground to Mandarin, due to its prestige and use as the language of instruction in Chinese vernacular schools. Some parents speak exclusively in Mandarin with their children. Some of the less-spoken regiolects, such as Hainanese, are facing extinction.

Tamil
Tamil and its Malaysian dialect are used predominantly by Tamils, who form a majority of Malaysian Indians. It is especially used in Peninsular Malaysia. The Education Act of 1996 regulates the use of Tamil as medium of instruction at the primary level in "national-type schools", and also entitles Tamil children to obtain Tamil classes in national primary schools and national secondary schools (which use Malay as medium of instruction), provided "it is reasonable and practicable so to do and if the parents of at least fifteen pupils in the school so request".

Tamil-speaking immigrants to Malaysia came from two groups, Sri Lankan Tamils who spoke Sri Lankan Tamil dialects such as the Jaffna Tamil dialect, and Indian Tamils who spoke dialect from Tamil Nadu. These dialects reflected class differences, with the Sri Lankan Tamils being more educated and overseeing the Indian Tamils, who primarily served as labourers on rubber estates. These two communities with their very different dialects remained mostly separate in Malaysia, forming two separate Tamil communities. Tamil is becoming less common among the more highly educated Tamil population, being predominantly replaced by English, and in a minority by Malay. Tamil-medium schools are considered less advantageous than English-medium schools, bringing little prospect of socioeconomic advancement. While the Malaysian government provides limited support for elementary Tamil schooling, secondary school is only taught in Malay, and there are no Tamil private schools. Usage of Tamil remains common among the less educated Tamil community, who often continue to live in their own communities on or near plantations, or in urban squatter settlements.

One small group of former Tamil speakers, the Chitty, almost entirely speak Malay.

Other Indian languages
The Malayalees in Malaysia are known to be the second largest Indian ethnicity, after the Tamils. Malayalees can be found in the West Coast states, mostly in Penang, Perak, Selangor, Negeri Sembilan, Malacca and Johore. They can be classified into three major groups: labourers, traders and government servants and estate clerks. Malayalee labourers were predominantly Hindus from Palakkad and Cannannore regions in Malabar. These communities spoke South Malabar dialect and Kannur dialect. Some of the labourers who were not associated with the Kangani system were placed in estates that had mix ethnicities, mostly Tamils. Thus, these labourers mix around with the Tamils and eventually used Tamil vocabularies in their language. Some have even received formal Tamil education, which eventually lead them to not speaking Malayalam as their first language but Tamil. The Malayalam-speaking traders who came to Malaya were mostly from the Muslim communities in Malabar. They spoke the Moplah dialect, which has influence of Arabic and Persian language. This particular dialect is still used among today's Malabari Muslims. Besides, Malayalees who were employed as estate clerks and semi-professional positions in the Malayan Civil Service consists of Hindus and Christians from Cochin and Travancore, as they were educated. These people spoke Malayalam dialects which are similar to the standard Malayalam spoken today. Many youngsters of the Malayalee community are unable to speak their mother tongue fluently because of the usage of English among the educated urban Malayalees and the domination of Tamil, as a lingua franca of the Malaysian Indians. Today, there are roughly more than 200,000 Malayalam speakers in Malaysia.

Other South Asian languages such as Bengali, Hindi, Punjabi, Sinhala and Telugu are also spoken.

Creoles
A small number of Malaysians have Eurasian ancestry and speak creole languages, such as the Portuguese-based Malaccan Creoles. A Spanish-based creole, Zamboangueño Chavacano, has spread into Sabah from the southern Philippines.

Sign languages
Sign languages include Malaysian Sign Language and the older Selangor Sign Language and Penang Sign Language.  No sign language is used in the education of the deaf.  Instead, Manually Coded Malay is used.

List of languages

Native languages in Peninsular Malaysia

Native languages in Malaysian Borneo

Other languages recognised as Native
Estimated number of speakers in Malaysia as of 2019:

Malaysian Chinese languages
The estimated numbers of speakers of Chinese languages in Malaysia as of 2019 are as follows:

Malaysian Indian languages
Estimated number of speakers in Malaysia as of 2019:

Foreign languages
 Arabic
 Burmese
 Filipino
 Japanese
 Khmer
 Korean

See also

 Demographics of Malaysia

References

Further reading

External links
 Languages of Malaysia at Muturzikin.com
 borneodictionary.com - Dictionary of Borneo Languages